Elections Nova Scotia is the non-partisan agency in Nova Scotia, of the legislative assembly charged with running provincial elections and administering provincial referendums. The Elections Act 2011 established Elections Nova Scotia as an independent, professional elections organization whose budget is approved directly by the legislature, and the act specifies that "The Office of the Chief Electoral Officer is to be known as Elections Nova Scotia."

References

External links
 

Nova Scotia
Politics of Nova Scotia